Baya is a town in northern Ivory Coast. It is a sub-prefecture of Boundiali Department in Bagoué Region, Savanes District.

Baya was a commune until March 2012, when it became one of 1126 communes nationwide that were abolished.

In 2014, the population of the sub-prefecture of Baya was 8,591.

Villages
The 6 villages of the sub-prefecture of Baya and their population in 2014 are:
 Baya (3 367)
 Kofre (995)
 Koundin ou Kounde (1 155)
 Nongana (1 096)
 Toungboli (240)
 Yele (1 738)

Notes

Sub-prefectures of Bagoué
Former communes of Ivory Coast